Coming Up Rosie was a Canadian children's sitcom TV series on CBC Television, aired for three seasons from 1975–1978.

Premise
The show focused on a group of tenants in an office building located at 99 Sumach Street, Toronto. Rosemary Radcliffe played the title character, aspiring Canadian documentary film-maker Rosie Tucker.

The initial cast also included Fiona Reid as Mona Swicker, an operator for the Ringading Telephone Answering Service; John Stoker as elevator operator Dwayne Kramer; Dan Hennessey as Ralph Oberding, salesman for the Neva-Rust Storm Door Company; Barry Baldaro as Rosie's production assistant Dudley Nightshade; and Dan Aykroyd as building janitor/superintendent Purvis Bickle.  

Aykroyd appeared as a regular in this series concurrently with his star-making turn on Saturday Night Live, which debuted less than a month after Coming Up Rosie. The name of Aykroyd's character ("Purvis Bickle") seemingly parodied the name of the disturbed "hero" of the 1976 film Taxi Driver, cab driver Travis Bickle...however, the film coincidentally debuted five months after this TV series began.

Cast member Fiona Reid was cast on King of Kensington almost simultaneously with the start of Coming Up Rosie, and citing her lack of improvisational skills ("I wasn't comfortable....Rosie demands a great improvisational head.  I need set lines."), left Coming Up Rosie only a few months after its debut.  Aykroyd also left the show after its first season.
  
Later cast members -- replacing Aykroyd and Reid -- included John Candy as Wally Wypyzypychwk, the Ukrainian owner of Sleep-Tite Burglar Alarms, and Catherine O'Hara as answering service operator Myrna Wallbacker.  Both Candy and O'Hara concurrently starred in Second City Television, actually appearing on Rosie concurrently with their early episodes of SCTV, which began in September 1976.  Candy was also a regular on the sitcom The David Steinberg Show (1976-77) during this period, thereby simultaneously appearing as a regular on three separate series for three different Canadian networks.

Many of the actors in this series also appeared in the less successful 1974–1975 CBC series Dr. Zonk and the Zunkins.

Broadcast
For the first season, the series aired at 4:30pm on Mondays, Wednesdays and Fridays. The series frequency was reduced to once per week for the remaining seasons, Mondays in 1976-77 and Tuesdays in 1977–78.

Cast
 Dan Aykroyd (Purvis Bickle)
 Barrie Baldaro (Dudley Nightshade)
 John Candy (Wally Wypyzypywchuk)
 Dan Hennessey (Ralph Oberding)
 Catherine O'Hara (Myrna Wallbacker)
 Rosemary Radcliffe (Rosie Tucker)
 Fiona Reid (Mona Swicker)
 John Stocker (Dwayne Kramer)

References

External links

1975 Canadian television series debuts
1978 Canadian television series endings
CBC Television original programming
1970s Canadian children's television series